Saliha Sera Kadıgil Sütlü (born 29 November 1984) is a Turkish politician and lawyer. She has served as a member of the Grand National Assembly of Turkey in its 27th legislative term since 2018. Initially a member of CHP, she later resigned and joined the Workers' Party of Turkey in 2021.

Early life and education
After graduating from Vefa High School in 2003, she graduated from Istanbul University Faculty of Law in 2007. She completed her master's degree in private law at the same university in 2010 and wrote her master's thesis on cinema works after her research at Queen Mary University of London. She is pursuing a doctorate at Istanbul University.

Career
Kadıgil Sütlü, who has been a member of the Istanbul Bar Association Animal Rights Commission Executive Board since 2008, has worked as a manager in many non-governmental organizations related to animal rights. She was a member of the CHP Women's Branch Central Board of Directors and served as a party council member for 3 terms. She is a member of the TBMM Equal Opportunities Committee for Women and Men. She resigned from CHP on Friday, 25 June 2021, and joined the Workers' Party of Turkey (TİP). She staged a protest against Fuat Oktay during a parliamentary budget hearing in 2021, where she played two songs, "Yalan" (Lie) and "Palavra palavra", through a loudspeaker. She received an official reprimand for the protest.

References

External links 

 Saliha Sera KADIGİL SÜTLÜ, Türkiye Büyük Millet Meclisi
 SALİHA SERA KADIGİL SÜTLÜ, CHP İstanbul İl Başkanlığı (Provincial Presidency of the CHP in Istanbul)

Contemporary Republican People's Party (Turkey) politicians
Members of the 27th Parliament of Turkey
21st-century Turkish women politicians
Istanbul University Faculty of Law alumni
Turkish jurists
1984 births
Politicians from Istanbul
Living people